Tarbes Pyrénées Football is a club football based in Tarbes, France. They formed in 2006 with the merger of Tarbes Stado Foot and Tarbes Gespe.

Club information
The club colours are red and violet which represent the main colours of the two merged clubs: the red of Tarbes Foot and the violet of Gespe. To reflect this the teams do not wear colours in the traditional home/away sense. Instead they rotate their strips as they feel appropriate from match to match.

The club badge represents the mountainous landscape of the pyrenees with two stars in the sky that represent the original clubs.

The club's highest accolade was winning the DH Midi-Pyrenees Championship in 2006 and achieving promotion to the French CFA2.

Stadium
Home games are played at the Tarbes Maurice-Trelut sports complex. The football ground is the second largest stadium in the complex, after the rugby stadium. In the complex the football stadium has a capacity of 3000 (1150 seats) and is located next to the main stadium, Stade Maurice-Trelut (16400/12500) which is sometimes used for matches with higher attendances.

Current squad

References

Football clubs in France
2006 establishments in France
Association football clubs established in 2006